Francis Wood may refer to:

Sir Francis Wood, 2nd Baronet (1771–1846), British landowner 
Francis C. Wood (1869–1951), American cancer researcher
Francis Derwent Wood (1871–1926), British sculptor
Francis M. Wood, American educator and school administrator

See also
Frances Wood (disambiguation)
Frank Wood (disambiguation)
St. Francis Wood, San Francisco, a residential neighborhood in southwestern San Francisco, California